Aizawl West I (Vidhan Sabha constituency) is one of the 40 assembly constituencies of Mizoram, a north east state of India. This constituency falls under Mizoram Lok Sabha constituency.

It is part of Aizawl district and is reserved for candidates belonging to the Scheduled tribes.

Members of the Legislative Assembly
 1978: Zairemthanga, Mizoram People's Conference
 1979: Zairemthanga, Mizoram People's Conference
 1984: K. Thansiami, Mizoram People's Conference
 1989: J. Tahnghuama, Independent
 1993: Lalkhana, Mizo National Front
 1998: Col. Lalchungnunga Sailo, Mizoram People's Conference
 2003: Aichhinga, Mizo National Front
 2008: Lalduhawma, Zoram Nationalist Party
 2013: K. Sangthuama, Mizo National Front
 2018: Lalduhoma, Independent

Election Results

2018

See also
 Mizoram Lok Sabha constituency
 Aizawl district

References

Assembly constituencies of Mizoram
Aizawl district